Kanaha Pond State Wildlife Sanctuary is a  wetland in Maui, Hawaii. This waterfowl sanctuary attracts two endangered Hawaiian bird species, the Hawaiian coot (alae, alae keokeo) (Fulica alai) and the Hawaiian stilt (aeo) (Himantopus mexicanus knudseni). Kanaha Pond was designated a state sanctuary in 1951 and a National Natural Landmark in 1971.
The site has hosted numerous vagrant birds, including Gray-tailed Tattler and Belted Kingfisher, as well as Hawaii's first record of Black-tailed Godwit.

Gallery

References

External links
Recovery Youth Conservation Corps day of service on Maui

Bird sanctuaries of the United States
Protected areas of Maui
Wetlands of Hawaii
Wildlife sanctuaries of the United States
Landforms of Maui
Nature reserves in Hawaii
National Natural Landmarks in Hawaii
Protected areas established in 1951
1951 establishments in Hawaii